Leonard Stanley Reid,  (21 September 1916 – 22 April 2003) was an Australian fighter pilot and politician who represented the Liberal Party as a member of the Victorian Legislative Assembly and the Australian House of Representatives.

Reid served as a fighter pilot in both the Royal Australian Air Force and on attachment to the Royal Air Force during the Second World War, and was awarded the Distinguished Flying Cross on 4 December 1942. After the war, he ran a dairy farm in Cranbourne, Victoria before being elected to the Electoral district of Dandenong at the 1958 Victorian state election. Reid served as the member for Dandenong for 11 years, before resigning his seat to contest the newly created federal Division of Holt, which covered much of the same area as Dandenong, at the 1969 federal election. Reid won narrowly, but was defeated at the 1972 federal election partly due to the swing that ousted the McMahon government and partly due to demographic changes which saw Dandenong develop as a major industrial centre.

Whilst a member of the lower House he crossed the floor and voted with the Labor Party or abstained from voting.

Len Reid was avidly connected with people who were marginalised in society and actively concentrated on the poor in India and Bangladesh. His publications included Crusade against Death. He played an important role with the charity "For Those Who Have Less".

Reid married Joan Averill Swallow, daughter of Leonard Swallow and Dorothy Comyn in 1946. She was the niece of Hugh Comyn and William Leslie Comyn. They had children Virginia and Roger.

References

1916 births
2003 deaths
Royal Australian Air Force personnel of World War II
Australian World War II flying aces
Liberal Party of Australia members of the Parliament of Australia
Members of the Australian House of Representatives
Members of the Australian House of Representatives for Holt
Members of the Victorian Legislative Assembly
Recipients of the Distinguished Flying Cross (United Kingdom)
Royal Australian Air Force officers
Liberal Party of Australia members of the Parliament of Victoria
20th-century Australian politicians
People from Clifton Hill, Victoria
People from Cranbourne, Victoria
Military personnel from Melbourne
Politicians from Melbourne